Hamulina is an extinct ammonoid cephalopod genus belonging to the family Hamulinidae.
These cephalopod were fast-moving nektonic carnivores. They lived during the Cretaceous period, Barremian age. The type species is Hamulina astieriana.

Description
It may be large. The whorl section generally is increasing rapidly. The short final shaft is generally straight or curved. The main shaft is with dense, fine, prorsiradiate minor ribs and distant, periodic, weakly trituberculate major ribs. The minor ribs are weakened or disappearing on hook and final shaft. The major ribs are strengthened and approximating. The ammonitic suture is finely divided.

Distribution
Fossils of these cephalopods have been found in rocks of Cretaceous of Bulgaria, Colombia (Santa Rosa de Viterbo, Boyacá), Hungary, Italy, Mexico, Spain, Trinidad and Tobago.

References

Further reading
 
 Arkell et al., 1957. Mesozoic Ammonoidea (L215); Treatise on Invertebrate Paleontology Part L Ammonoidea. Geological Soc. of America and Univ Kansas Press
 Sepkoski, Jack  Online Genus Database – Cephalopodes

Ammonitida genera
Ancyloceratoidea
Cretaceous ammonites
Ammonites of South America
Cretaceous Colombia
Altiplano Cundiboyacense
Cretaceous Europe
Cretaceous Mexico